In algebra, a triangular matrix ring, also called a triangular ring, is a ring constructed from two rings and a bimodule.

Definition

References

Ring theory